Android Nim is a version of the mathematical strategy game Nim programmed by Leo Christopherson for the TRS-80 computer in 1978.  A version for the Commodore PET by Don Dennis was released July 1979. Android Nim features real-time animation of the androids on a TRS-80.

Gameplay
The object of the game is to remove the last android from three rows of androids. The game's premise is simple, but its animation is impressive given the limitations of the TRS-80's display. Throughout the game androids are animated to face different directions, as if bored or engaging in conversation with one another.

The game starts with three rows of androids which contain 7, 5, and 3 androids respectively. An animated android asks the player if they would like to go first. The player chooses a row and types in how many droids to remove. An animated droid at the head of the row then nods its head and raises a gun and the other androids turn to look at the selected row. The specified number of androids are then zapped with a laser beam. It is then the computer's turn—with similar effect—and play continues until the last android is removed.

If the human wins, the computer is an amusingly poor sport and displays astonishment; if it wins, the computer displays a huge "I WIN!". If the computer is about to lose, it pretends to seek futile ways to avoid losing (i.e., by selecting more androids than are available in a given row) before giving up.

Reception
The game was reviewed in The Dragon #44 by Mark Herro. Herro stated, "if you want a good 'demo' program or just a little light entertainment — I think you could do worse than to try out this game. I like Android Nim."

References

External links
 PET gameplay video at YouTube
 Windows version by Leo Christopherson
review
Review in Creative Computing
Review in 80 Micro
Review in 80 Micro

1978 video games
Apple II games
Commodore PET games
SoftSide games
TRS-80 games
Public-domain software with source code
Video games developed in the United States